The Holberg Suite, Op. 40, more properly From Holberg's Time (Norwegian: Fra Holbergs tid), subtitled "Suite in olden style", is a suite of five movements based on eighteenth-century dance forms, written by Edvard Grieg in 1884 to celebrate the 200th anniversary of the birth of Dano-Norwegian humanist playwright Ludvig Holberg (1684–1754).

It exemplifies nineteenth-century music which makes use of musical styles and forms from the preceding century. Although not as famous as Grieg's incidental music from Peer Gynt, which is itself usually performed as arranged in a pair of suites, many critics regard the works as of equal merit.

Background 
The Holberg Suite was originally composed for the piano, but a year later was adapted by Grieg himself for string orchestra. The suite consists of an introduction and a set of dances. It is an early essay in neoclassicism, an attempt to echo as much as was known in Grieg's time of the music of Holberg's era.

Structure 
The movements of the suite are:

Piano version and string orchestration
"The music is thought out most idiomatically for both forces." However, the version for string orchestra differs in a number of respects from the solo piano original. The prelude in the piano version opens with a series of arpeggios:

The orchestral version replaces these with chords repeated in a dactylic rhythm:

Another striking transformation occurs in bars 31 to 34 of the prelude, which was originally conceived for piano as follows:

Grieg's orchestration develops this into a series of chords played by divisi violins. To this he adds a new counterpoint consisting of scales played pizzicato on violas:

Notes

External links
 
Performance of string orchestra version by A Far Cry from the Isabella Stewart Gardner Museum in MP3 format
 , Gerhard Oppitz
 , Symphony orchestra of the Hoch Conservatory, Barbara Kummer-Buchberger conducting.

Suites by Edvard Grieg
Compositions for string orchestra
1885 compositions
Compositions for solo piano
1884 compositions